Juan José Madrigal Pacheco (born March 8, 1974) is a Costa Rican former swimmer, who specialized in breaststroke events. He is a two-time Olympian (1996 and 2000), and a Costa Rican former record holder in the 50,100 and 200 m breaststroke (long course and short course).

Madrigal made his Olympic debut at the 1996 Summer Olympics in Atlanta, where he competed only in the 100 m breaststroke. Swimming in heat two, he held off Namibia's Jorg Lindemeier by three hundredths of a second (0.03) to pick up a third seed in 1:05.47.

At the 2000 Summer Olympics in Sydney, Madrigal qualified for a breaststroke double. He achieved FINA B-standards of 1:05.61 (100 m breaststroke) and 2:20.00 (200 m breaststroke) from the 2000 Janet Evans Invitational in USC Los Angeles, California, United States. 
In the 100 m breaststroke, held on the first day of the Games, Madrigal established a new Costa Rican record of 1:05.14 to lead the second heat, but ended up overall in forty-eighth place. Three days later, in the 200 m breaststroke, Madrigal placed forty-third on the morning prelims. Swimming in heat three.

References

1974 births
Living people
Costa Rican male swimmers
Olympic swimmers of Costa Rica
Swimmers at the 1996 Summer Olympics
Swimmers at the 2000 Summer Olympics
Male breaststroke swimmers
People from Alajuela